Tanquary Fiord Airport  is located at the southern side of Tanquary Fiord, Nunavut, Canada, close to the end of the fiord. It is located within Quttinirpaaq National Park and is maintained by Parks Canada. It serves as the main access to the park for tourists.

The aerodrome sketch for Tanquary Fiord is probably the simplest in the Canada Flight Supplement; it has nothing on it but a runway and an unlit wind sock.

References

Registered aerodromes in the Qikiqtaaluk Region
Airports in the Arctic